Heidi Van Horne is an American actress, pin-up model, producer and newspaper columnist.

Life
She was born in New Jersey. At the age of 14, she was cast in Dazed and Confused by director Richard Linklater thru which she was "Taft-Hartley'd" into the Screen Actors Guild), and thus launching her professional acting career.

She has acted in independent films and on TV series, including ER, The O.C. and Gilmore Girls; and as herself including appearing as the prize girl on the revival of The Gong Show with Dave Attell for Comedy Central and Happy Madison Productions.

She wrote a regular columns for Hearst Publications' Houston Chronicle from 2008-2018 that were syndicated in 14 markets across the U.S. and has authored pieces for other publications, such as Rewire.org and Traditional Rod & Kulture.

Filmography

Production filmography

Modeling
Van Horne has modeled for numerous clients including multiple book covers, magazine covers and spreads; various album covers; and for several companies, including Lucky 13, West Coast Choppers, General Electric, Borgata Casino Atlantic City and Pleaser shoes.

Book covers
Go With Moon! by Laurent Bagnard/Cast Iron Productions
Modern Vixens by Octavio Arizala/Goliath Press
Hot Rod Pin Ups by David Perry/Motorbooks Inc.
How to Be a Dominant Diva by Avalon Press

References

External links
 
 Heidi Van Horne on IMDb

Glamour models
Living people
American actresses
American columnists
Houston Chronicle people
Year of birth missing (living people)
American women columnists
21st-century American women